Innovative Food Science and Emerging Technologies is a quarterly peer-reviewed scientific journal covering basic and applied research in food science and technology. It is an official journal of the European Federation of Food Science and Technology. , its editors-in-chief are Dietrich Knorr (Berlin University of Technology) and Marc C. Hendrickx (Katholieke Universiteit Leuven). According to the Journal Citation Reports, the journal has a 2011 impact factor of 3.030.

References

External links 
 

Food science journals
English-language journals
Elsevier academic journals
Quarterly journals
Publications established in 2000